Håøya may refer to the following islands:

Håøya, Akershus in Frogn, Akershus, Norway
Håøya, Svalbard in Svalbard, Norway
Håøya, Telemark in Porsgrunn, Telemark, Norway
Håøya, Vestfold in Nøtterøy, Vestfold, Norway